The Schwarzhorn is a mountain in South Tyrol, Italy. It belongs to the Fiemme Mountains and is 2,439 m high.

References 

 Alpenverein South Tyrol

External links 

Mountains of the Alps
Mountains of South Tyrol
Fiemme Mountains
Two-thousanders of Italy